Oswald Kairamo (4 October 1858, in Jakobstad – 29 July 1938, in Hattula) was a Finnish politician and botanist. He was a member of the Senate of Finland.

References

1858 births
1938 deaths
People from Jakobstad
People from Vaasa Province (Grand Duchy of Finland)
Finnish Party politicians
Finnish senators
Members of the Parliament of Finland (1907–08)
Members of the Parliament of Finland (1908–09)
Members of the Parliament of Finland (1909–10)
Members of the Parliament of Finland (1910–11)
Members of the Parliament of Finland (1911–13)
Members of the Parliament of Finland (1917–19)
People of the Finnish Civil War (White side)